The 1912 Major League Baseball season was contested from April 11 to October 16, 1912. The New York Giants and Boston Red Sox were the regular season champions of the National League and American League, respectively. The Red Sox then defeated the Giants in the World Series, four games to three (with one tie).

This was the second of four seasons that the Chalmers Award, a precursor to the Major League Baseball Most Valuable Player Award (introduced in 1931), was given to a player in each league.

During the season, Harper's Weekly conducted a detailed accounting of the expenses of major league clubs, reaching a figure of approximately $175,000 to $200,000.

Awards and honors
Chalmers Award
Tris Speaker, Boston Red Sox, OF
 Larry Doyle, New York Giants, 2B

Statistical leaders

Standings

American League

National League

Postseason

Bracket

Managers

American League

National League

References

External links
1912 Major League Baseball season schedule at Baseball Reference Retrieved January 14, 2018

 
Major League Baseball seasons